"The Juggler" is a 1970 Australian television play about a movie producer. The ABC commissioned it from Yeldham, who was an Australian writer based in London at the time.

Cast
 Terence Cooper
 John Meillon as a movie producer
 Sandy Gore

References

External links
 

1970s Australian television plays
1970 television plays
1970 Australian television episodes
Australian Plays (season 2) episodes